333 Badenia (prov. designation:  or ) is a large background asteroid, approximately  in diameter, located the outer region of the asteroid belt. It was discovered on 22 August 1892, by astronomer Max Wolf at the Heidelberg-Königstuhl State Observatory in southwest Germany. The carbonaceous C-type asteroid has a rotation period of 9.9 hours. It was named after the historical Grand Duchy of Baden that existed until 1918, and where the discovering observatory is located. Badenia was the first asteroid to receive a provisional designation.

Orbit and classification 

Badenia is a non-family asteroid of the main belt's background population when applying the hierarchical clustering method to its proper orbital elements. It orbits the Sun in the outer main-belt at a distance of 2.6–3.6 AU once every 5 years and 6 months (2,023 days; semi-major axis of 3.13 AU). Its orbit has an eccentricity of 0.16 and an inclination of 4° with respect to the ecliptic.

Physical characteristics 

In the Tholen classification, Badenia is a common carbonaceous C-type asteroid, though with a nosy spectrum.

Rotation period 

In April 2017, a rotational lightcurve of Badenia was obtained from photometric observations by Frederick Pilcher. Lightcurve analysis gave a rotation period of  hours with a brightness variation of  magnitude.

Diameter and albedo 

According to the surveys carried out by the Infrared Astronomical Satellite IRAS, the Japanese Akari satellite and the NEOWISE mission of NASA's Wide-field Infrared Survey Explorer, Badenia measures between 64.01 and 78.51 kilometers in diameter and its surface has an albedo between 0.047 and 0.061. The Collaborative Asteroid Lightcurve Link adopts the results from IRAS, that is, an albedo of 0.0475 and a diameter of 78.17 kilometers based on an absolute magnitude of 9.46.

References

External links 
 Lightcurve Database Query (LCDB), at www.minorplanet.info
 Dictionary of Minor Planet Names, Google books
 Asteroids and comets rotation curves, CdR – Geneva Observatory, Raoul Behrend
 Discovery Circumstances: Numbered Minor Planets (1)-(5000) – Minor Planet Center
 
 

000333
Discoveries by Max Wolf
Named minor planets
000333
18920822